Maroarivo Ankazomanga is a rural municipality in southwest Madagascar. It belongs to the district of Betioky, which is a part of Atsimo-Andrefana Region.

References

Populated places in Atsimo-Andrefana